Up the River is a 1938 American prison comedy film directed by Alfred L. Werker and starring Preston Foster and Arthur Treacher and featuring Bill "Bojangles" Robinson. The film is a remake of a 1930 film with the same name directed by John Ford and starring Spencer Tracy and Humphrey Bogart in the roles subsequently played by Foster and Tony Martin. The remake changed the sport the plot revolves around from baseball to football.

Plot
A passenger on a luxury liner ends up in a card game with men who take him for more than $20,000. After docking and graciously offering them a ride in a limousine, the man reveals his real name, Willis, and real identity, police officer, to the two men who swindled him, Chipper Morgan and Darby Randall.

Morgan and Randall are sent to prison, where, to their amazement, Willis is the new warden. Their young cellmate Tommy Grant is on the prison's football team while Tommy's sweetheart Helen Lindsey awaits his parole.

When the team improves significantly thanks to Morgan and Randall and a big game is arranged with a team from another prison, wagers are made, jailbreak schemes are hatched and complications arise. Morgan and Randall are unable to get to the game until the final play, but their touchdown makes the warden happy and their fellow prisoners as happy as prisoners can be.

Cast
Preston Foster	as 'Chipper' Morgan
Tony Martin as Tommy Grant
Phyllis Brooks as Helen
Slim Summerville as Slim Nelson
Arthur Treacher as Darby Randall
Alan Dinehart	 as Warden Wallis
Eddie Collins	as Fisheye Conroy
Jane Darwell as Mrs. Graham
Sidney Toler as Jeffrey Mitchell
Bill Robinson as Memphis Jones
Edward Gargan as Tiny
Robert Allen	as Ray Douglas
Dorothy Dearing as Martha Graham
Charles D. Brown as Warden Harris

References

Bibliography 
 Stephen C. Wood & J. David Pincus. Reel Baseball: Essays and Interviews on the National Pastime, Hollywood and American Culture McFarland, 2003.

External links

1938 comedy films
1930s prison films
1938 films
20th Century Fox films
American black-and-white films
American comedy films
Remakes of American films
American football films
American prison comedy films
Films directed by Alfred L. Werker
1930s English-language films
1930s American films